Proverbs 23 is the 23rd chapter of the Book of Proverbs in the Hebrew Bible or the Old Testament of the Christian Bible. The book is a compilation of several wisdom literature collections, with the heading in 1:1 may be intended to regard Solomon as the traditional author of the whole book, but the dates of the individual collections are difficult to determine, and the book probably obtained its final shape in the post-exilic period. This chapter specifically records "the sayings of wise".

Text
The original text is written in Hebrew language. This chapter is divided into 35 verses.

Textual witnesses
Some early manuscripts containing the text of this chapter in Hebrew are of the Masoretic Text, which includes the Aleppo Codex (10th century), and Codex Leningradensis (1008).

There is also a translation into Koine Greek known as the Septuagint, made in the last few centuries BC. Extant ancient manuscripts of the Septuagint version include Codex Vaticanus (B; B; 4th century), Codex Sinaiticus (S; BHK: S; 4th century), and Codex Alexandrinus (A; A; 5th century).

Analysis
This chapter is a part of the third collection in the book of Proverbs (comprising Proverbs 22:17–24:22), which consists of seven instructions of various lengths:
 1st instruction (22:17–23:11)
 2nd instruction (23:12–18)
 3rd instruction (23:19–21)
 4th instruction (23:22–25)
 5th instruction (23:26–24:12)
 6th instruction (24:13–20) and 
 7th instruction (24:21–22)

The sayings are predominantly in the form of synonymous parallelism, preceded by a general superscription of the entire collection in 22:17a: "The words of the wise" (or "Sayings of the Wise").  This collection consists of an introduction that the youths should be instructed and exhorted to listen to and obey their "teachers" (parents), followed by a series of admonitions and prohibitions coupled with a variety of clauses, primarily presented in short parental instructions (cf. 23:15, 22; 24:13, 21). 

The 'thirty sayings' (Proverbs 22:20) in this collection are thought to be modelled on the 'thirty chapters' in Egyptian Instruction of Amen-em-ope the son of Kanakht (most likely during the Ramesside Period ca. 1300–1075 BCE), although the parallels extend only in Proverbs 22:17–23:11 and the extent of the dependence is debatable.

True riches (23:1–21)
This section forms the body of a collection titled "Sayings of the Wise" (22:17), containing 5 of 7 sets of instruction. 
Verses 1–3 give some further advice about table manners during a royal feast, that is, to 'put a knife to your throat' (a forceful expression for 'curb your appetite') in front of 'deceptive food' (literally, "bread of lies") because there could be an ulterior motive behind the abundant hospitality that can cause one's undoing. Verses 4-5 warn against accruing wealth as the main goal in life because riches are like a mirage: no sooner here than gone. Verses 10–11 warn against land appropriation of the defenseless people through the removal of the boundary stones (cf. 15:25; 22:28), because although there is no human 'kinsman' to defend their rights (cf. Leviticus 25:25; Ruth 4), God himself will become their redeemer (cf. 22:23). Verses 13–14 affirm the value of disciplining of children (cf. 13:24; 20:30; 22:15), as this will save them from following the paths leading to death and direct them along the path of life (cf. 13:14; 15:24). Verses 19–21 advise to avoid the company of drunkards and gluttons as excessive eating and drinking would lead to indiscipline, inertia and ultimately to poverty.

Verse 6
Do not eat the bread of a man who is stingy; do not desire his delicacies,
"A man who is stingy": or "a miser" (NKJV), literally, "one who has an evil eye".

Verse 7
Selfish people are always worrying
about how much the food costs.
They tell you, “Eat and drink,”
but they don’t really mean it.

Listen to your father and mother (23:22–35)
A reminder to take heed of the advice from one's father and mother precedes the warning against the seductress (verses 26–28), who is likened to a deep and narrow 'pit' (cf. Jeremiah 38:6–13; probably representing the gateway to Sheol, cf. 2:18–19; 5:5, 27; 22:14), or to a huntress who traps (cf. 7:22–23) and to a robber who lies in wait for her victims (cf. 7:12). Verses 29–35 describe the seduction of a drunkard by the power of wine which 'eye' ('sparkles' in verse 31 is literally 'gives its eye') and 'smoothness' (cf. Song of Songs 7:9) are comparable to the words of the seductress in chapters 1–9 (cf. 6:24–25). In both cases the promise of pleasure and enjoyment ('at the last', verse 32; 'in the end', 5:4) will lead to degenerative effects—both physical and mental—on its victims (verses 29, 33–35).

Verse 31
Do not look on the wine when it is red,
When it sparkles in the cup,
When it swirls around smoothly;
"Swirls around smoothly" (KJV: "moveth itself aright"): or "goes around smoothly"

Verse 32
For in the end it bites like a poisonous snake;
it stings like a viper.

See also

Related Bible parts: Psalm 7, Proverbs 9, Proverbs 18, Proverbs 22, Proverbs 24, Proverbs 28

References

Sources

External links
 Jewish translations:
 Mishlei - Proverbs - Chapter 23 (Judaica Press) translation [with Rashi's commentary] at Chabad.org
 Christian translations:
 Online Bible at GospelHall.org (ESV, KJV, Darby, American Standard Version, Bible in Basic English)
 Book of Proverbs Chapter 23 King James Version
  Various versions

23